Apostle Mignone Alice Kabera is a Rwandan woman who is one of the first Apostle women in Rwanda. She is the Founder and leader of Women foundation Ministries  and Noble Family Church but WFM is an association that focuses on developing Rwandan women in the areas of spirituality and the issues they face in their daily lives, including in the home, at work and beyond.

WFM Projects 
Women foundation ministries has a lots of project conducted every year among these there is Thanks giving event this happened in Gasabo district Nduba sector 

in partnership with the district of Gasabo this was more of charity as well as participating in local sustainable development of vulnerable communities in Rwanda.

Normally the government of Rwanda encourages Institution to create more opportunities  for local citizens that they should not let down the government by serving people whose their lives are really endangered because of poverty as well as malnutrition. in that case Women Foundation Ministries started that initiative  of supporting communities on large scales every year to eradicate poverty and malnutrition.

They provided 17 000 000 Rwndan francs to support district activities and also the offered food , clothing , schools materials , life insurance of about 10 000 000

Rwndan Francs. all these they do every year is to empower families through women

Awards 
Apostle Alice Mignonne Kabera has received many rewards. Among them is the Sifa Award for compassionate work, which is organized every year in the name of "Thanksgiving". She organizes many events throughout the year to empower women in Rwandan society, such as "All Women Together" with the theme "From Victims to Champions". all women together is a huge conference which brings all women in each and every county where the foundation reaches. and  they celebrate 

all the projects , activities and impact which is being created by women in their respective counties , families.

She also organizes events to help couples in their marriages, including the "Couples Dinner" event.

Weblinks 
  Mignone Alice Kabera on womenfoundationministries.org

References 

Women Christian religious leaders
Rwandan religious leaders
Living people
Year of birth missing (living people)